The World Skat Championship has been organised biennially since 1978 by the International Skat Players Association (ISPA) at various locations worldwide and is the highest level Skat competition in the world. It alternates with the European Skat Championship which has taken place biennially since 1979 and which ISPA also organises. In addition to the title of World Skat Champion, players compete for other titles: the Women's World Skat Champion, a Youth World Champion, a Veteran World Champion and a Veteran Women's World Champion.

In addition, there is an award for the best team (since 1980) and the best mixed team.

In 1992 a award for the best nation was introduced.

Past championships and winners

External links 
 List of ISPA World Champions
 Skat World Champions

Skat (card game)
World championships